Africa Magic Viewers' Choice Awards (AMVCA) is an annual accolade presented by MultiChoice recognizing outstanding achievement in television and film. The inaugural Africa Magic Viewers’ Choice Awards ceremony was held in Lagos, Lagos State in Nigeria on 9 March 2013, and was broadcast live in more than 50 countries. Entries into the award ceremony are films and TV series that have been aired in the previous year.

Ceremonies

Categories 
The following are the 2018 categories:

Statistics

Most nominations

By a film 
10 and up

By an individual

Most wins

By a film 
4 and up

References

External links 
 

 
Awards established in 2012
Entertainment events in Nigeria
Nigerian film awards
Annual events in Lagos